The 31st New York State Legislature, consisting of the New York State Senate and the New York State Assembly, met from January 26 to April 11, 1808, during the first year of Daniel D. Tompkins's governorship, in Albany.

Background
Under the provisions of the New York Constitution of 1777, amended by the Constitutional Convention of 1801, 32 Senators were elected on general tickets in the four senatorial districts for four-year terms. They were divided into four classes, and every year eight Senate seats came up for election. Assemblymen were elected countywide on general tickets to a one-year term, the whole Assembly being renewed annually.

In 1797, Albany was declared the State capital, and all subsequent Legislatures have been meeting there ever since. In 1799, the Legislature enacted that future Legislatures meet on the last Tuesday of January of each year unless called earlier by the governor.

State Senator Henry Huntington resigned in 1807, leaving a vacancy in the Western District.

At this time the politicians were divided into two opposing political parties: the Federalists and the Democratic-Republicans.

In 1805, the 28th Legislature had chartered the Merchant's Bank of New York which had been founded by Federalists in competition to the Democratic-Republican Bank of the Manhattan Company. The Democratic-Republican majority of the 27th Legislature had not only refused to grant a charter, but actually ordered the Merchant's Bank to shut down by May 1805. During the next session, the bank bribed enough legislators to have the charter approved, although the Democratic-Republican leaders advocated strongly against it. Gov. Morgan Lewis spoke out in favor of granting the charter what was resented by the party leaders DeWitt Clinton and Ambrose Spencer, and soon led to the split of the party into "Lewisites" and "Clintonians". The 30th Legislature had a Lewisite-Federalist majority and elected a Council of Appointment which removed most Clintonian office-holders. The Lewisites and the Federalists nominated Gov. Morgan Lewis for re-election and Thomas Storm as his running mate. The Clintonians nominated Supreme Court Justice Daniel D. Tompkins for governor, and the incumbent Lt. Gov. John Broome for re-election.

Elections
The State election was held from April 28 to 30, 1807. Tompkins and Broome were elected. For the first time in State history an incumbent governor ran for re-election and was defeated.

Senators DeWitt Clinton (Southern D.), Joshua H. Brett (Middle D.) and John Tayler (Eastern D.) were re-elected. Robert Williams (Middle D.), Isaac Kellogg, John McLean, Charles Selden (all three Eastern D.); and Assemblyman Alexander Rea (Western D.) were also elected to full terms in the Senate. William Floyd (Western D.) was elected to fill the vacancy. Brett and Williams were Lewisites, the other seven were Clintonians.

Sessions
The Legislature met at the Old City Hall in Albany on January 26, 1808; and adjourned on April 11.

Alexander Sheldon (Cl.) was again elected Speaker. Daniel Rodman (Cl.) was elected Clerk of the Assembly with 60 votes against 21 for the incumbent Gerrit Y. Lansing (Lew.).

On February 1, the Clintonian majority elected a new Council of Appointment which removed most Lewisite office-holders.

On February 5, the Legislature elected David Thomas (Cl.) to succeed Abraham G. Lansing (Lew.) as New York State Treasurer.

On February 8, 1808, State Senator Joseph C. Yates was appointed to the New York Supreme Court, leaving a vacancy in the Eastern District. The Legislature re-apportioned the Senate seats, and transferred one seat each from the Southern, the Middle and the Eastern (the vacant one) districts to the Western District.

On February 12, Sebastian Visscher was elected Clerk of the Senate to succeed Solomon Southwick.

On April 1, 1808, the Legislature also re-apportioned the Assembly districts. The total number of assemblymen was increased from 100 to 112. Broome and Tioga were separated with 1 seat each. Allegany, Genesee and Ontario were separated with 1 seat for Genesee, 5 for Ontario and Allegany was joined with Steuben. Jefferson, Lewis and St. Lawrence were separated with 2 seats for Jefferson and 1 each for Lewis and St. Lawrence. Cayuga, Chenango, Madison and Onondaga gained 1 seat each; New York City and Oneida gained 2 each. Dutchess, Rensselaer, Washington and Westchester lost 1 seat each. Franklin County was split from Clinton County but remained in the same Assembly district. Niagara County was split from Genesee County, and had 1 seat in the Assembly.

State Senate

Districts
The Southern District (6 seats) consisted of Kings, New York, Queens, Richmond, Suffolk and Westchester counties.
The Middle District (8 seats) consisted of Dutchess, Orange, Ulster, Columbia, Delaware, Rockland and Greene counties.
The Eastern District (9 seats) consisted of Washington, Clinton, Rensselaer, Albany, Saratoga, Essex and Montgomery counties.
The Western District (9 seats) consisted of Herkimer, Ontario, Otsego, Tioga, Onondaga, Schoharie, Steuben, Chenango, Oneida, Cayuga, Genesee, Seneca, Jefferson, Lewis, St. Lawrence, Allegany, Broome and Madison counties.

Note: There are now 62 counties in the State of New York. The counties which are not mentioned in this list had not yet been established, or sufficiently organized, the area being included in one or more of the abovementioned counties.

Members
The asterisk (*) denotes members of the previous Legislature who continued in office as members of this Legislature. Alexander Rea changed from the Assembly to the Senate.

Employees
Clerk: Solomon Southwick
Sebastian Visscher, from February 12, 1808

State Assembly

Districts

Albany County (6 seats)
Allegany, Genesee and Ontario counties (3 seats)
Broome and Tioga counties (1 seat)
Cayuga County (2 seats)
Chenango County (2 seats)
Clinton County (1 seat)
Columbia County (4 seats)
Delaware County (2 seats)
Dutchess County (7 seats)
Essex County (1 seat)
Greene County (2 seats)
Herkimer County (3 seats)
Jefferson, Lewis and St. Lawrence counties (1 seat)
Kings County (1 seat)
Madison County (2 seats)
Montgomery County (5 seats)
The City and County of New York (9 seats)
Oneida County (3 seats)
Onondaga County (2 seats)
Orange County (4 seats)
Otsego County (4 seats)
Queens County (3 seats)
Rensselaer County (5 seats)
Richmond County (1 seat)
Rockland County (1 seat)
Saratoga County (4 seats)
Schoharie County (2 seats)
Seneca County (1 seat)
Steuben County (1 seat)
Suffolk County (3 seats)
Ulster County (4 seats)
Washington County (6 seats)
Westchester County (4 seats)

Note: There are now 62 counties in the State of New York. The counties which are not mentioned in this list had not yet been established, or sufficiently organized, the area being included in one or more of the abovementioned counties.

Assemblymen
The asterisk (*) denotes members of the previous Legislature who continued as members of this Legislature.

Employees
Clerk: Daniel Rodman
Sergeant-at-Arms: Thomas Donnelly
Doorkeeper: Benjamin Whipple

Notes

Sources
The New York Civil List compiled by Franklin Benjamin Hough (Weed, Parsons and Co., 1858) [see pg. 108f for Senate districts; pg. 120 for senators; pg. 148f for Assembly districts; pg. 181 for assemblymen]
The History of Political Parties in the State of New-York, from the Ratification of the Federal Constitution to 1840 by Jabez D. Hammond (4th ed., Vol. 1, H. & E. Phinney, Cooperstown, 1846; pages 246-265)
Election result Assembly, Cayuga Co. at project "A New Nation Votes", compiled by Phil Lampi, hosted by Tufts University Digital Library
Election result Assembly, Dutchess Co. at project "A New Nation Votes"
Election result Assembly, Herkimer Co. at project "A New Nation Votes"
Partial election result Assembly, Jefferson, Lewis and St. Lawrence Co. at project "A New Nation Votes" [gives only votes from Lewis Co.]
Election result Assembly, Kings Co. at project "A New Nation Votes"
Election result Assembly, Onondaga Co. at project "A New Nation Votes"
Election result Assembly, Queens Co. at project "A New Nation Votes"
Election result Assembly, Richmond Co. at project "A New Nation Votes"
Election result Assembly, Seneca Co. at project "A New Nation Votes"
Election result Assembly, Washington Co. at project "A New Nation Votes"
Election result Senate, Southern D. at project "A New Nation Votes"
Election result Senate, Middle D. at project "A New Nation Votes"
Election result Senate, Eastern D. at project "A New Nation Votes"
Election result Senate, Western D. at project "A New Nation Votes"
Election result, Assembly Clerk at project "A New Nation Votes"
Election result, Council of Appointment at project "A New Nation Votes"

1807 in New York (state)
1808 in New York (state)
031
1807 U.S. legislative sessions